The name Beta has been used for two tropical cyclones in the Atlantic Ocean.

 Hurricane Beta (2005), Category 3 hurricane that made landfall in Nicaragua
 Tropical Storm Beta (2020), tropical storm that made landfall in Texas

Atlantic hurricane set index articles